Daniel LeBlanc may refer to:

 Daniel LeBlanc (musician), member of band Grand Dérangement
 Daniel LeBlanc (settler), early settler of the Port Royal area of Acadia
 Daniel W. LeBlanc (1931–2013), American jurist